Dezider Egri (born 20 June 1992) is a Slovak football defender who currently plays for Fortuna Liga club FC DAC 1904 Dunajská Streda. He is ethnic Hungarian.

Club career

DAC Dunajská Streda
Egri made his professional Fortuna Liga debut for FC DAC 1904 Dunajská Streda against ŠK Slovan Bratislava on 2 April 2016.

References

External links
 FC DAC 1904 Dunajská Streda profile
 
 Eurofotbal profile
 Futbalnet profile

1992 births
Living people
Slovak footballers
Association football defenders
ŠK Senec players
FC DAC 1904 Dunajská Streda players
Slovak Super Liga players
Hungarians in Slovakia
Sportspeople from Dunajská Streda